Odorrana nasuta (Hainan bamboo-leaf frog) is a species of frogs in the family Ranidae that is endemic to Hainan, China. It occurs near streams in forested regions at elevations of  asl. Breeding takes place in streams. It is threatened by habitat loss caused by smallholder farming activities and clear-cutting of forests.

Description
Males measure  and females  in snout–vent length.

References

nasuta
Amphibians described in 2001
Frogs of China
Endemic fauna of Hainan
Taxonomy articles created by Polbot